The Golden Sheaf Award for the best Comedy production is presented by the Yorkton Film Festival.

History
In 1947 the Yorkton Film Council was founded.  In 1950 the first Yorkton Film Festival was held in Yorkton, Saskatchewan, Canada.  During the first few festivals, the films were adjudicated by audience participation through ballot casting and winners were awarded Certificates of Merit by the film festival council.  In 1958 the film council established the Yorkton Film Festival Golden Sheaf Award for the category Best of Festival, awarded to the best overall film of the festival.  Over the years various additional categories were added to the competition.

In 1993 the Golden Sheaf Award for best Comedy production was added to the Main Entry Categories of the film festival competition. The winner of this award is determined by a panel of jurors chosen by the film council. This award is presented to the best production "in any genre intended primarily to elicit laughter or provide humour."  As of 2020, the Golden Sheaf Award categories included: Main Entry Categories, Accompanying Categories, Craft Categories, and Special Awards.

Winners

1990s

2000s

2010s

2020s

References 

Awards established in 1993
Yorkton Film Festival awards